The enzyme methylthioribulose 1-phosphate dehydratase catalyzes the chemical reaction

5-(methylsulfanyl)-D)ribulose 1-phosphate  5-(methylthio)-2,3-dioxopentyl phosphate + H2

This enzyme belongs to the family of lyases, specifically the hydro-lyases, which cleave carbon-oxygen bonds.  The systematic name of this enzyme class is 5-methyl-5-thio-D-ribulose-1-phosphate 4-hydro-lyase [5-(methylthio)-2,3-dioxopentyl-phosphate-forming]. Other names in common use include 1-PMT-ribulose dehydratase, and S-methyl-5-thio-D-ribulose-1-phosphate hydro-lyase.  This enzyme participates in methionine metabolism.

References

 
 

EC 4.2.1
Enzymes of unknown structure